Babatunde Adetomiwa Stafford "Tomiwa" Edun,  (born 1985) is a Nigerian actor. He is best known for his roles as Sir Elyan in the television show Merlin, Marcus Young in Bates Motel and Alex Hunter in the football video games FIFA 17, FIFA 18 and FIFA 19.

Early life 
Edun was born in Lagos, Nigeria, to Nigerian financier Olawale Edun and half-Ghanaian, half-English Amy Adwoa (née Appiah). His maternal uncle is the philosopher, cultural theorist and novelist Kwame Anthony Appiah. His maternal grandparents were Ghanaian lawyer, diplomat and politician Joseph Emmanuel Appiah- a Nana of the Ashanti people through whom Edun is a descendant of Ghanaian warrior emperor Osei Tutu- and art historian and author Peggy Cripps, daughter of Sir Stafford Cripps, Chancellor of the Exchequer from 1947 to 1950 and son of the first Lord Parmoor. Through his father, meanwhile, Edun claims direct descent from the colonial Egba official Adegboyega Edun.

Edun moved to the United Kingdom at the age of 11. He attended Eton College from the age of 13, before reading Classics at Christ's College, Cambridge (University of Cambridge). In his final year at Christ's College, he won the dissertation prize for his thesis on Homer's Odyssey. His father, a financier, encouraged Edun to enter banking as a career, and he interned with Citigroup. He considered studying for a Master of Philosophy degree, but decided to attend the Royal Academy of Dramatic Art (RADA) instead.

Career 
In 2000, Edun appeared at the Edinburgh Fringe Festival as the character Clifford in the show Kassandra by Ivo Stourton. Edun attended RADA, appearing in several productions and graduating with a Bachelor of Arts in Acting in 2008. Following his graduation from RADA, he played small parts in productions at the Almeida Theatre and the Liverpool Playhouse. He also played Macbeth in a production of the eponymous play by the National Theatre, earning praise for being "charismatic" and a "fine verse speaker". In 2009, Edun became only the second black actor to play Romeo at the Globe Theatre when he was cast in Dominic Dromgoole's production of Romeo and Juliet. He also appeared in Slaves, a play by Rex Obano.

Edun has also appeared in several television shows. In 2009, he appeared in an episode of The Fixer, before a role in Law & Order: UK as a soldier returning from the war in Afghanistan. During series three of Merlin, Edun appeared as Elyan in three episodes, and was upgraded to a recurring character in series four. Elyan was killed off during the fifth and final series of Merlin in 2012. In 2011, he appeared in two episodes of The Hour as the character Sey, and reprised the role for three episodes in 2012. In 2015, Edun had a recurring role on the third season of Bates Motel as Marcus Young, a candidate for sheriff of White Pine Bay, which he followed with roles in Lucifer, Legends, and Death in Paradise. He also appeared as Mr Brocks in the 2016 Doctor Who Christmas Special. The following year, Edun portrayed a war criminal in an episode of Elementary.

Edun performed motion capture and voiced the role of Alex Hunter in the video game by EA Sports, FIFA 17, and reprised his role in the sequels FIFA 18 and FIFA 19.

Filmography

Film

Television

Video games

Theatre

See also
 Black British nobility, Edun's class in Britain

References

External links 
 

1984 births
Alumni of Christ's College, Cambridge
Alumni of RADA
Living people
Nigerian male stage actors
People educated at Eton College
Male actors from Lagos
English people of Yoruba descent
English people of Ghanaian descent
Yoruba male actors
21st-century Nigerian male actors
British male Shakespearean actors
Nigerian people of Ghanaian descent
Nigerian people of English descent
Nigerian emigrants to the United Kingdom
Nigerian male television actors